The 1955–56 Maccabi Haifa season was the club's 43rd season since its establishment in 1913, and 8th since the establishment of the State of Israel.

At the start of the season, the league which started during the previous season was completed, with the club finishing 6th. The new league season, with the top division being renamed Liga Leumit, began on 3 December 1955 and was completed on 3 June 1956, with the club finishing 5th.

During the season, the club also competed in the State Cup, which was also carried over the summer break. The club eliminated city rivals Hapoel Haifa in the quarter finals, winning 4–0, but was defeated by Maccabi Tel Aviv 0–5 in the semi-finals.

On 15 September 1955 a new stadium, Kiryat Eliezer Stadium, officially called Haifa Municipal Stadium or Luigi Antonini Stadium, was opened with a match between a Haifa XI and a Tel Aviv XI. Maccabi Haifa started playing home matches in the stadium on 24 September 1955, starting with a match against Hapoel Haifa.

Match Results

Legend

International friendly matches
During the season Maccabi Haifa played three international friendly matches, losing all of them.

1954–55 Liga Alef
The league began on 6 February 1955, and by the time the previous season ended, only 20 rounds of matches were completed, with the final 6 rounds being played during September and October 1955.

Final table

Matches

Results by match

1955–56 Liga Leumit

Final table

Matches

Results by match

State Cup

Shapira Cup
While the promotion playoffs and the State Cup were being played in October and November, two cup competitions were organized by Liga Leumit Clubs, the second edition of the Shapira Cup, and the Netanya 25th Anniversary Cup. Maccabi Haifa, Hapoel Petah Tikva, Maccabi Tel Aviv and Hapoel Tel Aviv played for the Shapira Cup, named after former Hapoel Tel Aviv treasurer Yosef Shapira. The competition was designed to be played as a double round-robin tournament. However, the competition was delayed after the teams played only two matches each. The third-round matches were postponed due to weather conditions and the 1954–55 Israel State Cup final, which involved Maccabi Tel Aviv and Hapoel Petah Tikva. As league matches started on 3 December 1955, the competition was abandoned altogether.

Table

References

 

Maccabi Haifa F.C. seasons
Maccabi Haifa